Alicia Maude (born 17 May 2002) is an English rugby union player.

Maude started playing rugby aged six in Hampshire and played for England U18s prior to being signed to Gloucester-Hartpury Women. Maude was called up to the England sevens squad in April 2022 for the HSBC World Sevens Series tournament in Canada.

Maude was selected to play for England at the 2022 Commonwealth Games in rugby sevens. She was named in the England squad for the 2022 Rugby World Cup Sevens – Women's tournament held in Cape Town, South Africa in September 2022.

References

 

2002 births
Living people
Female rugby union players
England women's international rugby union players
English female rugby union players
21st-century English women